Alonakia is a municipal department of the city of Kozani in northern Greece. Located west of the city centre, it has a population of 368 in 2011.

References

Kozani
Populated places in Kozani (regional unit)